Avgustinka may refer to:
Avgustinka, a diminutive of the Russian male first name Avgustin
Avgustinka, a diminutive of the Russian female first name Avgustina